Route 66 is a Connecticut state highway running from Meriden to Windham, serving as an alternate east–west route to US 6 through east-central Connecticut.

Route description
Route 66 officially begins at I-91 in Meriden as the extension of I-691, which officially ends at its interchange with I-91. This freeway portion runs for about  into the town of Middlefield, where it becomes a four lane surface road.  In Middlefield, it has junctions with the northern end of Route 147, and the southern end of Route 217.  It then enters Middletown and becomes Washington Street, where it has junctions with the northern end of Route 157 and the southern end of Route 3 before passing by Wesleyan University and entering the downtown area. Route 66 then turns onto Main Street, as Washington Street becomes SR 545, providing southbound access to the Route 9 freeway.  At the north end of Main Street, it intersects Route 17.  Southbound Route 17 provides access to both directions of Route 9, while northbound Route 17 joins Route 66 to cross the Connecticut River on the Arrigoni Bridge into Portland.  Immediately east of the bridge, it meets the southern end of Route 17A, which leads to Portland center.  After Route 17 leaves to the north, Route 66 narrows to 2 lanes and follows the east shore of the Connecticut River into East Hampton. It passes the northern end of Route 151, and bends northeast as it intersects the western end of Route 16.  In the center of town, it meets the northern end of Route 196, then crosses into Marlborough.  Here, it has a junction with the Route 2 freeway at Exit 13.  It then passes into Hebron, Connecticut, where it has junctions with Routes 85 and 316 in the center of town.  It then enters Columbia, intersecting Route 87 before reaching a junction with US 6 at the western end of the Willimantic bypass.  Route 66 turns east as a collector of local traffic headed for Willimantic.  In Willimantic, it has a 0.74 mile concurrency with Route 32, and intersects the southern end of Route 195, and the western end of Route 14.  It then turns north-northeastward and continues to US 6 at the east end of the Willimantic bypass, where Route 66 ends and US 6 assumes the roadway.

From US 6 in Columbia to the end in Windham, Route 66 is designated the Grand Army of the Republic Highway. The easternmost  of the route is named Boston Post Road and was part of the former mail route.

History 
The entire length of modern Route 66 was originally improved in the 19th century as various private turnpikes. The road from Meriden to Middletown was the Middletown and Meriden Turnpike chartered in 1809 and used the former surface alignment of Route 66 in Meriden (East Main Street). Between Middletown and East Hampton, modern Route 66 was the western half of the Colchester and Chatham Turnpike (the eastern half is modern Route 16), which was chartered in 1808. From East Hampton via Marlborough to the Hebron-Columbia line, the road was the Hebron and Middle Haddam Turnpike that was chartered in 1802. From the Hebron-Columbia line through Columbia to Willimantic, the road was the Columbia Turnpike, chartered in 1808. 

Route 66 was originally part of State Highway 111 designated in 1922. It ran from the Milldale section of Southington, via Meriden and Middletown, to Willimantic. In the 1932 state highway renumbering, old Highway 111 was designated as part of Route 14, which extended from Woodbury to the Rhode Island state line. In 1941, the section of Route 14 from Woodbury to Willimantic was redesignated as US 6A, connecting at US 6 on both ends. 

In the early 1960s, plans for constructing a US 6A expressway between I-84 in Southington and Willimantic were announced. By 1966, a short portion of the expressway from US 5 in Meriden to Middlefield (where the current expressway ends) opened to traffic. By 1968, the US 6A designation was removed and split into several routes. The section from I-84 in Southington to US 6 in Columbia was renumbered as Route 66, including the newly opened freeway segment.  In 1971, another section of the Route 66 freeway opened from between Route 322 and US 5. In 1987, with the completion of the freeway connection to I-84, the section of Route 66 west of I-91 was redesignated as I-691, truncating the western end of Route 66. In 1983, US 6 was rerouted to a newly constructed bypass around Willimantic, and the former surface route section of US 6 from Columbia to Windham was transferred to Route 66.

Major intersections
Exits are currently sequential and continue from I-691, but are planned to be converted to mileage-based exit numbering in 2023.

References

External links

Conn. Rt. 66 endpoint photos

066
Transportation in New Haven County, Connecticut
Transportation in Middlesex County, Connecticut
Transportation in Hartford County, Connecticut
Transportation in Tolland County, Connecticut
Transportation in Windham County, Connecticut
U.S. Route 6
Transportation in Windham, Connecticut